Gaznaq (also Romanized as Gazanq) is a village in Bash Qaleh Rural District, in the Central District of Urmia County, West Azerbaijan Province, Iran. At the 2006 census, its population was 393, in 116 families.

References 

Populated places in Urmia County